Matrix Fitness (UCI code MAT) was a British cycling team which competed in road bicycle racing and track cycling events from 2009 to 2016. For the 2015 season the team registered as a UCI Women's Team, the top level of professional women's cycling, so could compete in elite international events including the UCI Women's Road World Cup. The team was sponsored by Matrix Fitness, Milltag, and Vulpine.

Team history

2014
The team announced that in 2015 they would become a UCI Women's team. Trek will sponsor the team for the first season in the top division of Women's cycling, with the team riding the same bikes as the men's  team.

Riders in
For the 2015 season the team signed track World Champions, Elinor Barker and Laura Trott from rival British team . The team also signed Sara Olsson (Team Hitec Products), Lucy Martin (Estado de México–Faren Kuota), Christina Siggaard (Firefighters Upsala CK) and Molly Weaver. The team also negotiated contract extensions with Melissa Lowther, Harriet Owen, Penny Rowson and Jessie Walker.

Team roster

2015

As of 10 March 2015. Ages as of 1 January 2015.

Major wins

2012
UCI Track World Cup London (Team pursuit), Dani King & Joanna Rowsell
UCI Track World Cup London (Individual pursuit), Joanna Rowsell
Johnson Health Grand Prix, Annabel Simpson
Newport Nocturne Criterium, Penny Rowson
Olympic Games, Track (Team Pursuit), Dani King & Joanna Rowsell
Rochster Cyclo-cross I, Helen Wyman
Rochster Cyclo-cross II, Helen Wyman
Breinigsville Cyclo-cross, Helen Wyman
Baltimore Cyclo-cross I, Helen Wyman
Baltimore Cyclo-cross II, Helen Wyman
Gloucester Cyclo-cross, Helen Wyman
Providence Cyclo-cross I, Helen Wyman
Providence Cyclo-cross II, Helen Wyman
Koppenberg Cyclo-cross, Helen Wyman
Iowa City Cyclo-cross I, Helen Wyman
Iowa City Cyclo-cross II, Helen Wyman
Iowa City Cyclo-cross II, Helen Wyman
Gieten Cyclo-cross, Helen Wyman
2014
National Championship, Helen Wyman
Otegem Cyclo-cross, Helen Wyman
Middelkerke Cyclo-cross, Helen Wyman
Heerlen Cyclo-cross, Helen Wyman
Baltimore Cyclo-cross, Helen Wyman
Baltimore Cyclo-cross I, Helen Wyman
Gloucester Cyclo-cross II, Helen Wyman
's-Hertogenbosch Cyclo-cross, Helen Wyman
2015
Revolution Series – Manchester (Scratch), Elinor Barker
Grand Prix of Poland (Omnium), Laura Trott
Grand Prix of Poland (Scratch), Laura Trott
Jeux Africains 2015 de Brazzaville Road Race, Kimberley Le Court

National, continental and world champions

2012
 British Cyclocross, Helen Wyman
 World Track (Team pursuit), Dani King
 World Track (Team pursuit), Joanna Rowsell
 British U23 National XC, Annabel Simpson
 European Cyclocross, Helen Wyman
2015
 British Track (Individual pursuit), Laura Trott
 British Track (Points race), Laura Trott
 British Track (Scratch race), Laura Trott
 European (Team Pursuit), Laura Trott
 European (Team Pursuit), Elinor Barker
 European (Scratch race), Laura Trott
 European (Omnium), Laura Trott

References

UCI Women's Teams
Cycling teams based in the United Kingdom
Cycling teams established in 2009